Etawah is a constituency of the Uttar Pradesh Legislative Assembly covering the city of Etawah in the Etawah district of Uttar Pradesh, India.

Etawah is one of five assembly constituencies in the Etawah Lok Sabha constituency. Since 2008, this assembly constituency is numbered 200 amongst 403 constituencies.

Members of the Legislative Assembly

Election results

2022

2017
Bharatiya Janta Party Smt. Sarita Bhadauria won in 2017 Uttar Pradesh Legislative Elections defeating Samajwadi Party candidate Kuldeep Gupta by a margin of 	17,342 votes.

References

External links
 

Assembly constituencies of Uttar Pradesh
Etawah